The 1995 Chicago Bears season was their 76th regular season completed in the National Football League (NFL). The Bears matched to a second straight 9–7 record under head coach Dave Wannstedt, but failed to make the playoffs due to a tiebreaker loss to the Atlanta Falcons. The Bears started the 1995 NFL season as one of the hottest teams with a 6–2 record halfway through the season; however, a stunning overtime home loss to the Pittsburgh Steelers 37–34 triggered a three-game losing streak as part of losing five out of their next six games falling to a disappointing 7–7 record, essentially eliminating themselves out of playoff contention.

Offseason

1995 Expansion Draft

NFL draft

Undrafted free agents

Staff

Roster

Regular season

Schedule

Standings

References

External links

 1995 Chicago Bears at Pro-Football-Reference.com

Chicago Bears
Chicago Bears seasons
Bear
1990s in Chicago
1995 in Illinois